The Lignon is a  long river in the Ardèche département, southern France. Its source is at La Souche, in the Parc naturel régional des Monts d'Ardèche. It flows generally east-northeast. It is a right tributary of the Ardèche into which it flows between Meyras and Pont-de-Labeaume.

Communes along its course
This list is ordered from source to mouth:
Ardèche: La Souche, Jaujac, Fabras, Meyras, Pont-de-Labeaume

References

Rivers of France
Rivers of Auvergne-Rhône-Alpes
Rivers of Ardèche